The 1991 West Virginia derecho was a serial derecho (storm) that started in Arkansas in the early morning hours of April 9, 1991, and made its way northeast, finally dying out over Pennsylvania late that evening.

Two people were killed and 145 were injured in the event, mainly from falling trees, flying debris, and mobile homes and trailers being overturned. Western and central West Virginia were affected by hail and several roads were blocked. Most of the destructive damage occurred in Tennessee, Kentucky, West Virginia, western Maryland, and Western Pennsylvania. The fatalities associated with this storm occurred in Charleston, West Virginia and Huntington, West Virginia as a result of the high winds.

Damage claims
In West Virginia alone, there were 8,000 insurance damage claims for homes and businesses. Over 200,000 people lost power in the derecho. Many people experienced flickering lights and power surges. This derecho was the worst severe weather event for West Virginia since the 1974 Super Outbreak.

What is a Derecho? 
There are several criteria for a mesoscale convective system (MCS) to be considered a derecho. The system needs to have sustained winds of 58 mph, and stretch along a boundary at least 250 miles long. There must also be isolated wind gusts of 75 mph or greater.

Formation of a Derecho 
 There needs to be sufficient convective available potential energy (CAPE) in the atmosphere for several thunderstorm cells to form.  
 There needs to be sufficient inflow of air in the lower atmosphere, with strong upper level divergence in the upper atmosphere.  
 There needs to be an elevated mixed layer leading to a rapid decrease in temperature with height.  
 There needs to be high values of vertical wind shear (45 mph or greater) in the lowest 5 kilometers of the atmosphere. 
 The system usually has a bow echo type of shape.  
This is a rather simplified list of conditions needed to form a derecho. However, when all of these conditions occur simultaneously in the atmosphere, a derecho storm system has the potential to form.

See also
List of derecho events

References

External links
Storm Prediction Center's "About Derechos" summary of the West Virginia Derecho of April 1991

West Virginia Derecho, 1991
West Virginia Derecho, 1991
Derechos in the United States
Natural disasters in Arkansas
Natural disasters in Tennessee
Natural disasters in West Virginia
Natural disasters in Pennsylvania
Natural disasters in Kentucky
Natural disasters in Maryland
West Virginia Derecho, 1991
West Virginia derecho
April 1991 events in the United States